Marina di Giacomo (born 1976) is an Argentine field hockey player. She was born in Godoy Cruz, Mendoza. She won a bronze medal at the 2004 Summer Olympics in Athens.

References

External links

1976 births
Living people
Sportspeople from Mendoza Province
Las Leonas players
Argentine female field hockey players
Olympic field hockey players of Argentina
Field hockey players at the 2004 Summer Olympics
Olympic bronze medalists for Argentina
Olympic medalists in field hockey
Medalists at the 2004 Summer Olympics
Pan American Games medalists in field hockey
Pan American Games gold medalists for Argentina
Field hockey players at the 2003 Pan American Games
Medalists at the 2003 Pan American Games